The Ministry of National Guard is a cabinet-level ministry and one of the major military sectors of the Government of Saudi Arabia, responsible for security and national defence matters. The Saudi Arabian National Guard is under the administrative control of the Ministry of National Guard.

Ministers 
The current Minister is Prince Abdullah bin Bandar, who was appointed to this position on 27 December 2018. The deputy minister is Abdulmohsen bin Abdulaziz al-Tuwaijri. The Head of the Military Apparatus at the ministry is Lieutenant general Mohammed al-Nahid.

References

Bibliography

External links

SA National Guard official site
NG Health Affairs official site

 
National
Law enforcement units
1947 establishments in Saudi Arabia
 
Saudi